Stenoma persita is a moth of the family Depressariidae. It is found in Peru.

The wingspan is about 19 mm. The forewings are pale greyish ochreous, sprinkled throughout with dark fuscous and with a small dark fuscous spot on the costa at one-fourth, and larger ones at the middle and three-fourths. The stigmata are dark fuscous and obscure, the plical very obliquely beyond the first discal, some fuscous suffusion behind the second discal. A curved series of indistinct fuscous dots is found from the third costal spot to the dorsum before the tornus and there is a marginal series of dark fuscous dots around the apex and termen. The hindwings are grey.

References

Moths described in 1915
Taxa named by Edward Meyrick
Stenoma